Elections to the Vale of White Horse District Council were held on 6 May 2011. The entire council was up for election and resulted in the Liberal Democrats losing control of the council to the Conservatives, who regained control for the first time since 1995.

Election results 

Composition of the council following the 2011 election:

Conservative 31
Liberal Democrat 19
Labour 1

References

2011 English local elections
2011
2010s in Oxfordshire